Ellabell is an unincorporated community in Bryan County, Georgia, United States. It is on the outskirts of Savannah, It is located on Georgia Route 204 about 7 miles east of Pembroke, Georgia, and about 23 miles west of Savannah. The Community is centered around an intersection of GA SR 204 and Black Creek Church Road, which is a county road. The Georgia Central Railway which runs parallel to GA SR 204 (Until a point about 3 miles east of Ellabell) also passes through Ellabell. Ellabell is the location of Glen Echo, which is listed on the U.S. National Register of Historic Places. Ellabell is located in the Savannah metropolitan area.

Ellabell, Ga shares zip code 31308 with the other surrounding unincorporated communities of Blitchton, Georgia and Black Creek, Georgia. According to the Census Bureau the population for the combined area was 7,353 in 2017

Notable people
Mattie Belle Davis, first woman judge of Metropolitan Court of Dade County, Florida and  first woman in Florida elected to the American Bar Foundation, the second woman to be elected in the US. A street in Ellabell is named in her honor.

Justin Smiley, a former NFL player for the San Francisco 49ers, is also from Ellabell.

References

Unincorporated communities in Bryan County, Georgia
Unincorporated communities in Georgia (U.S. state)